The Loft is an online and app-based music channel on Sirius XM Radio which features a format of eclectic adult album alternative music, occasionally branching off into more freeform music and talk programming.

Until November 12, 2008, it broadcast an acoustic rock format. The Loft then changed formats to what sounded like the now-defunct SIRIUS Disorder and Fine Tuning stations by that time, with its sister channel, The Coffee House, adopting the acoustic rock format. Mike Marrone was the channel's program director and primary on-air voice until his retirement in December 2017. He was replaced by Chris Muckley, who is heard regularly alongside DJs such as Franny Thomas and Meg Griffin.

In 2018, The Loft transitioned to an entirely online XM presence, as its former channel is now used for limited-engagement theme channels focused on specific artists, such as The Eagles and Billy Joel.

Current programming
Featured programs on the channel include:
 The Loft Over Easy - laid-back music for a Sunday morning.
 Disorder - a freeform show hosted Saturday mornings by Meg Griffin. 
 Celtic Crush - an eclectic sampler of Irish sounds hosted by Larry Kirwan.
 The Loft Sessions - a series of live performances recorded at XM's studio facilities.
 Chris Muckley In The Loft - a freeform show hosted Saturday afternoons by Chris Muckley.
 In Spite Of All The Danger - one-hour weekly show of new music releases hosted by Franny Thomas (previously hosted by Mike Marrone).

Past programming
 Wake Up Sets - curated and hosted by Mike Marrone.
 Your Roots Are Showing - a modern roots rock show hosted by Franny Thomas.
 Playing Records with Mike - guests joined Mike Marrone to play some of their favorite music.
 From the Living Room to the Loft - music and interviews from the Living Room Club in New York.
 Vin Scelsa's Idiot's Delight - a freeform program hosted by the longtime New York radio personality.
 Lou Reed's New York Shuffle - a freeform program hosted by the veteran rocker with co-host Hal Willner.
 American Roots Radio with Bernie Taupin - a roots music show hosted by the songwriter with sidekick Paca Thomas.

Core artists
Bob Dylan
The Rolling Stones
Tom Waits
Lucinda Williams
The Beatles
Warren Zevon
NRBQ
Neko Case
Beck
David Johansen
Larry Kirwan

References

External links
The New York Times: "High-Tech Quirkiness Restores Radio's Magic."

Sirius Satellite Radio channels
XM Satellite Radio channels
Sirius XM Radio channels
Adult album alternative radio stations in the United States
Radio stations established in 2001